Charles Coupar Barrie, 1st Baron Abertay,  (7 June 1875 – 6 December 1940), was a Scottish businessman and Liberal Party and later Liberal National politician in the United Kingdom.

Background and education
Charles Barrie was born in Glasgow, the eldest son of Sir Charles Barrie, Lord Provost of Dundee, and Jane Ann Cathro. He was educated at the High School of Dundee and Blairlodge School, Polmont.

Political career
Barrie served during the First World War in an advisory capacity at the Transport Department of the Admiralty, and latterly in the Ministry of Shipping. He was the Minister of Munitions representative in Paris during the Peace Conference, and was a Member of the Supreme Economic Council. He also served as Chairman of the Navy, Army, and Air Force Institutes and as a Member of the Advisory Council to the General Post Office. He was Liberal Member of Parliament (MP) for Elgin Burghs briefly during 1918, for Banffshire from 1918 to 1924 and later sat for Southampton from 1931 to 1940 as a Liberal National.

Barrie was appointed a CBE in 1918 and a KBE in 1921. On 26 June 1940, he was raised to the peerage as Baron Abertay, of Tullybelton in the County of Perth. He also held the Russian Order of St Stanislaus and the Danish Order of the Dannebrog.

Business career
Barrie was also a shipowner and merchant, and held a number of business appointments including as a Director of the London and North Eastern Railway, of the Central Argentine Railway, of the Mercantile Bank of India, of Phoenix Assurance Company, and of Cable and Wireless Ltd.

Personal life
In 1926, at age 51, he married Ethel Broom, only daughter of Sir James Broom, and died at Tullybelton, Perthshire, in 1940, leaving three daughters (June, Rosemary and Caroline). The peerage became extinct upon his death.

References

External links 
 

1875 births
1940 deaths
Knights Commander of the Order of the British Empire
Barrie, Charles
Barrie, Charles
Barrie, Charles
People educated at the High School of Dundee
Scottish justices of the peace
Barrie, Charles
Barrie, Charles
Barrie, Charles
Barrie, Charles
Barrie, Charles
Barrie, Charles
UK MPs who were granted peerages
Barrie, Charles
National Liberal Party (UK, 1931) politicians
Barons created by George VI